Vhulaudzi Secondary School is a school in Vhulaudzi, Limpopo, South Africa (near Louis Trichardt) covering grades eight through twelve.
The school was found in 1975 and was first named Mutshedzi Secondary School, the school and the district agreed to change the school to Vhulaudzi Secondary School in 1982.

Clubs and activities
 Arts and Culture
 Athletics
 Netball
 Soccer
 Volleyball

Notable alumni 

 Shirley Machaba, first black female chief executive officer of PwC Southern Africa

References

External links

Schools in Limpopo
Educational institutions established in 1963
1963 establishments in South Africa